Douglas Henry Scovil (July 1, 1927 – December 9, 1989) was an American football player and coach. He served as the head football coach at the University of the Pacific in Stockton, California from 1966 to 1969 and at San Diego State University from 1981 to 1985, compiling a career college football record of 45–51–3.  Following his stint as head coach for the San Diego State Aztecs, Scovil worked as the quarterbacks coach for the Philadelphia Eagles of the National Football League (NFL), where he was credited with developing Randall Cunningham, until his death from a heart attack at Veterans Stadium during the 1989 season. In memory of Scovil's passing, the Eagles marked their helmets with black electrical tape for the rest of the season.

Scovil's coaching stops included the College of San Mateo, the United States Naval Academy, Brigham Young University (BYU), and the San Francisco 49ers of the NFL.  While serving as quarterbacks coach at BYU, Scovil mentored future NFL quarterbacks Gifford Nielsen, Marc Wilson, and Jim McMahon.

Scovil played at Stockton Junior College and at the University of the Pacific.

Coaching career
While head coach at San Diego State, he helped develop several players under the system he had started at BYU.
1981: QB Matt Kofler was 262/436 for 3,337 yards with 21 TD vs 15 INT. WR Darius Durham had 65 catches for 988 yards with 7 TD.
1982: WR Darius Durham had 45 catches for 781 yards with 4 TD. WR Clinton Sampson had 32 catches for 665 yards with 7 TD.
1983: WR Jim Sandusky had 69 catches for 1,171 yards with 6 TD. WR Vince Warren had 28 catches for 594 yards with 5 TD.
1984: RB Mike Waters ran for 704 yards with 5 TD. WR Webster Slaughter had 40 catches for 576 yards with 3 TD.
1985: QB Todd Santos was 226/357 for 2,877 yards with 21 TD vs 17 INT. RB Chris Hardy ran for 1,150 yards with 7 TD (on just 158 carries). WR Webster Slaughter had 82 catches for 1,071 yards with 10 TD. WR Vince Warren had 38 catches for 788 yards with 5 TD.

Head coaching record

College

References

External links
 

1927 births
1989 deaths
American football quarterbacks
BYU Cougars football coaches
Delta College Mustangs football players
Navy Midshipmen football coaches
Pacific Tigers football coaches
Philadelphia Eagles coaches
San Diego State Aztecs football coaches
San Francisco 49ers coaches
High school football coaches in California
Junior college football coaches in the United States
People from Anacortes, Washington